José de Cadalso y Vázquez (Cádiz, 1741 – Gibraltar, 1782), Spanish, Colonel of the Royal Spanish Army, author, poet, playwright and essayist, one of the canonical producers of Spanish Enlightenment literature.

Before completing his twentieth year, Cadalso had traveled through Italy, Germany, England, France and Portugal, and he had studied the history and literature of these countries. On his return to Spain he entered the army and rose to the rank of colonel.

Cadalso was the embodiment of the Enlightenment ideal of the "hombre de bien", a learned and well-rounded citizen whose multitude of interests could be utilized to improve society.  He was a central figure in the literary landscape of eighteenth-century Spain, especially in the tertulia held at the Fonda de San Sebastián.  He influenced a number of Spanish authors, not least among them a young and talented Juan Meléndez Valdés.

His first published work was a verse tragedy, Don Sancho García, Conde de Castilla (1771). In  1772, he published his Los Eruditos a la Violeta, a commercially successful prose satire on the obsession with superficial knowledge and the appearance of erudition. In 1773 appeared a volume of miscellaneous poems, Ocios de mi juventud.

Cadalso is best known for his Cartas marruecas, an epistolary novel published posthumously by the "Correo de Madrid" in 1789 and as a book in 1793.  The Cartas marruecas have often been compared to Montesquieu's, (1689–1755), own Lettres Persanes, (Persian Letters, 1721),  although in reality both works represented the period's fascination with epistolary narrative.  Cartas Marruecas and Noches lúgubres are often considered his best works, although they are stylistically and thematically different.

Whereas Cartas marruecas is a rational, multi-perspectivistic examination of Spanish society through the eyes of a young Moroccan, Noches lúgubres ("Lugubrious Nights"),  is a short prose work centered on a mourning protagonist's desire to disinter his dead lover, and was published from 1789 to 1790 in the journal El correo de Madrid. The later work was inspired by the death of his close friend, holding amorously her dying body, actress María Ignacia Ibáñez, (1745 – April 1771, aged 26).

This work, along with a number of Cadalso's anguished lyrical compositions, are considered an antecedent of Romanticism in Spain, if not fully Romantic in their own right. An edition of his works appeared at Madrid, in 3 vols., 1823. This was supplemented by the Obras inéditas (Paris, 1894) published by R. Foulch-Delbosc.

Cadalso was killed at the Great Siege of Gibraltar, on 27 February 1782, just 15 days after being promoted to Colonel. He has a tomb in Saint Mary the Crowned Church in San Roque.

References

 O. N. V. Glendinning. Vida y obra de Cadalso". Madrid. Ed. Gredos, (1962), 239 pages.
 Sebold, R.P. . Colonel Don José Cadalso . New York, Twayne Publ. (1971), 187 pages.
  Sebold,  Russell  P.  Cadalso: El primer romantico "europeo" de Espana''.  Madrid: Ed.  Gredos, (1974), 294 pages.

1741 births
1782 deaths
Enlightenment philosophers
Age of Enlightenment
Spanish male writers
People from Cádiz